Johannes Sæbøe (born 1976) is a Norwegian musician, notable for his act in the progrock band White Willow. Sæbøe was recruited on electric guitar in 2000 and featured on the album Sacrament and Storm Season. He left the group shortly after Storm Season.

After White Willow Sæbøe played in the Ska band No Torso for a short while until the group disbanded in 2009. He is now reported to be a part of a local Oslo band called Frank Znort Quartet.

References

1976 births
Living people
Norwegian male bass guitarists
21st-century Norwegian bass guitarists
21st-century Norwegian male musicians